This is a list of tributaries of the River Tees from its source at Teeshead to its mouth at Middlesbrough.

Teeshead Source to Cow Green Reservoir

 Slate Sike
 Swath Beck
 Crooked Beck
 Rake Sike
 Fallcrag Sike 
 Trout Beck  
 Tynegreen Sike
 Great Dodgen Pot Sike
 Crook Burn  
 Smithy Sike
 Little Dodgen Pot Sike
 Green Hurth Sike  
 Force Burn

Cow Green Reservoir

The following waterways empty into the reservoir.

 Borderonmere Sike  
 Dubby Sike
 Dubbysike East Grain
 Near Hole Sike
 Weelhead Sike
 Cowgreen Sike
 Stapestone Sike
 Red Sike
 Whitespot Sike
 Deadcrook Sike
 Cockle Sike
 Rowantree Sike  
 Mattergill Sike

Cow Green Reservoir to Middleton-in-Teesdale

 Maize Beck  
 Tinkler's Sike
 Birkdale Hush
 Merrygill Beck
 Crookus Gill
 Black Sike
 Fox Earth's Gill
 Fold Sike
 Holmwath Sike
 Wildscar Sike
 South Loom Sike
 Harwood Beck
 Little Sike
 Dufton Sike
 Fell Dike Sike
 Skyer Beck
 Blea Beck
 Smithy Sike
 Hag Sike
 Ettersgill Beck
 How Gill
 Stony Beck
 Bow Lee Beck
 Newbiggin Beck
 Mill Beck
 Unthank Beck
 Brockersgill Sike
 Owl Gill
 Stonygill Sike
 Park End Beck
 Crossthwaite Beck
 Hudeshope Beck

Middleton-in-Teesdale to Barnard Castle

 River Lune
 Intake Sike
 Low Beck Springs
 Eggleston Burn
 Beer Beck
 Raygill Beck
 Wilden Beck
 River Balder
 Lance Beck
 Grise Beck
 Scur Beck
 Deepdale Beck
 Gill Beck

Barnard Castle to Darlington

 Thorsgill Beck
 River Greta
 Whorlton Beck
 Peg Beck
 Alwent Beck
 Black Beck
 Piercebridge Beck
 Ulnaby Beck
 Baydale Beck

Darlington to Middlesbrough

 Claw Beck
 River Skerne
 Spa Beck
 Dalton Beck
 Kent Beck
 Wood Head Gill
 Soursike Gill
 Staindale Beck
 Fardean Side
 Worsall Far Gill
 Worsall Gill
 Hole Beck
 Nelly Burden's Beck
 River Leven
 Bassleton Beck
 Old River Tees
 Lustrum Beck
 Billingham Beck
 Ormesby Beck
 Normanby Beck
 Greatham Creek

References

Tees
 
Tributaries
 
Tees